The following is a list of Teen Choice Award winners and nominees for the Choice TV Actress – Drama award, which was formerly known as the Choice TV Actress – Action/Drama award.

Winners and nominees

2000s

2010s

References

Drama Actress
Awards for actresses